The Margański & Mysłowski EM-10 Bielik is a low-cost Polish military training aircraft prototype, built by Margański & Mysłowski Zakłady Lotnicze, and first flown on 4 June 2003. The single-engine aircraft has a composite (mostly carbon fibre) fuselage with a light-alloy aft section, and the pressurized cockpit is fitted with ejection seats.

Specifications (EM-10 prototype)

References

External links

 Margański EM-10 Bielik

2000s Polish military trainer aircraft
EM10
Single-engined jet aircraft
Mid-wing aircraft
Aircraft first flown in 2003
Twin-tail aircraft